Randy Bernsen  (born July 15, 1954) is an American jazz guitarist.

Career
Bernsen was born in Needham, Massachusetts and grew up in Florida. He attended high school in Plantation and was active in the clubs of South Florida, starting at age 17. He studied at the University of Miami. During the mid-1970s, he was a part of the Peter Graves Orchestra, which played in Bachelors III with Jaco Pastorius. In 1977, he was a part of Blood, Sweat & Tears. Bernsen's debut album, Music for People, Planets & Washing Machines (1986), featured numerous greats of fusion jazz, including  Urszula Dudziak, Bob James, Herbie Hancock, Jaco Pastorius and Peter Erskine. After good reviews, Bernsen managed to sign up for the follow-up album, Mo' Wasabi, with Wayne Shorter, Michael Brecker, Marcus Miller, Steve Gadd, and Toots Thielemans.

Bernsen has toured since the 1990s with his own groups from Fort Lauderdale. Occasionally he was on concert tours in  Europe, Southeast Asia and Mexico. In 1992, he was involved in Joe Zawinul's album Lost Tribes. In 2003 he recorded and edited a tribute to Jaco Pastorius, Word of Mouth Revisited, with the Peter Graves Orchestra, followed in 2006 by The World is Out. Tom Lord recorded 42 recordings with Bernsen between 1979 and 2006.

Bernsen has also been a professional private pilot since 1998 qualified on Learjets, Jetstar, PC-12 and Hondajet.

Discography

Albums 
 Music for People, Planets & Washing Machines (Amc, 1984)
 Mo' Wasabi (Zebra, 1986)
 Paradise Citizens (Zebra, 1988)
 Calling Me Back Home (101 South, 1993)
 AppTeaser  (self-released, 2012)
 Grace Notes (self-released, 2015)

Single download 
 "Revelation 5:1"
 "Folksy"
 "Alone Together" (2021)
 "Abba Father" (2021)

Randy BernsenReferences

External links 
 Official site
 Article at the South Florida Sun Sentinel
 

1954 births
Living people
Jazz fusion guitarists
American jazz composers
People from Plantation, Florida
The Zawinul Syndicate members